Washington Magnet Elementary School is a historic school and building located at Raleigh, Wake County, North Carolina.  It was built in 1923-1924 to serve African-American students in Raleigh and is now a magnet elementary school.

History
From 1924 until 1953, Washington served as the only secondary education institution for black students in Raleigh. This changed with the establishment of John W. Ligon Junior-Senior High School, which assumed that role.

In 1982, Washington became an elementary school involved with the magnet program and Gifted & Talented curriculum.

Washington was listed on the National Register of Historic Places in 2001 as the Washington Graded and High School. In 2003, it received designation as a Local Historic Site by the City of Raleigh's Historic Preservation Association.

Building
Washington Graded and High School was originally constructed in 1923-1924 as part of the city of Raleigh's plans to expand the education system in order to accommodate increasing numbers of school-aged children. The project was funded by a portion of the money from a million dollar bond issued by the school board on April 4, 1922. At the time of its completion in 1924, The original building is a two-story, brick building with Tudor Revival style design elements. A three-story rear addition was built in 1927, a track in 1942, a gymnasium in 1949, and other additions were made in 1996 and 2000. The building was renovated from 2002-2003.

Notable alumni 
 John H. Baker Jr., former NFL defensive lineman and long-time Wake County sheriff
 Maycie Herrington, history conservator
 June Kay Campbell, civil rights activist
 Pee Wee Moore, jazz saxophonist
 Millie Dunn Veasey, civil rights activist and United States Army veteran

Notable faculty 
 John W. Ligon, interim principal which John W. Ligon Middle School was named after

References

External links

African-American history in Raleigh, North Carolina
Historically segregated African-American schools in North Carolina
School buildings on the National Register of Historic Places in North Carolina
Tudor Revival architecture in North Carolina
Former high schools in North Carolina
Gifted education
Magnet schools in North Carolina
Public high schools in North Carolina
Public elementary schools in North Carolina
School buildings completed in 1924
Schools in Raleigh, North Carolina
National Register of Historic Places in Raleigh, North Carolina
1924 establishments in North Carolina